Heteropneustes kemratensis, the airsac catfish, is a species of catfish native to Myanmar, Laos and Thailand.

References

Heteropneustes
Freshwater fish of Asia
Fish of Laos
Fish of Myanmar
Fish of Thailand
Fish described in 1937
Taxa named by Henry Weed Fowler